Grammy Award winning American metal band Tool has toured worldwide extensively.

Tool has performed songs by other artists occasionally in their live sets, including "Spasm" and "You Lied" by Peach, "Stranglehold" by Ted Nugent, "Demon Cleaner" by Kyuss, "No Quarter" by Led Zeppelin, and "Commando" by The Ramones.

The song "Ticks & Leeches" is only rarely performed live due to the immense strain on Keenan's voice. However, they have performed it at least a few times during their 2001 (Irvine, California) and 2002 tours including appearances in Sacramento, California, Tacoma, Washington, Fort Lauderdale, Florida, Katowice (Poland), London (England), and Berlin (Germany), with Keenan using heavy vocal effects and distortion. Tool added 'Ticks & Leeches' back to the set list for the 2012 North American Winter Tour.

Tour history

In 1991, Tool played a number of small clubs in the Los Angeles, area and were signed to a major label. The two live tracks of the Opiate EP were recorded during a December 31, 1991, performance. Tool Embarked on a U.S. club tour in 1992, playing only one Canadian and one Mexican date. The band often played on a small stage, with minimal or no lighting, sometimes to only a handful of people. The set list would change from night to night, but would usually include most (if not all) of Opiate and a handful of then unreleased songs from Undertow. Some were performed with working lyrics such as "Undertow" and "Bottom".

Tool toured extensively in 1993. The band found themselves on many European festivals as well as the U.S. Lollapalooza festival. They were drawing such a crowd playing the second stage at Lollapalooza, that they were moved up to the main stage, midway through the tour. The band debuted the songs "Intolerance", "Prison Sex" and "Flood" on January 26, 1993. The set list would vary from night to night, depending on the time slot Tool was allotted, but "Sober" and "Prison Sex" were always played.

Tool Toured Europe and the U.S. again in 1994. The band debuted their cover of Led Zeppelin's "No Quarter" as well as the songs "Disgustipated", "Pushit" and "Stinkfist". "No Quarter" often transitioned into "Disgustipated", and "Opiate" would be played back-to-back with "Flood", transitioning smoothly between songs and skipping the lengthy intro to "Flood". During this time, Tool's stage show began to grow and better reflect the band. During a show in London at Shepards Bush, the band had a man dressed as Jesus join them on stage. At the same show, future Tool member (then member of opening band Peach) Justin Chancellor joined the band for the song "Sober". Around the same time, tensions began between Keenan and D'Amour. As in previous years, the set list would change from night-to-night for most of 1994.

Tool only played a small number of shows during 1995, but it was a very important year for the band. Debuting the songs "Eulogy", "H" and "Ænema", all in early forms with working lyrics. Tensions were very high between Keenan and D'Amour during this time, and April 14, 1995, would be D'Amour's last live show with the band.

In 1996, Tool began their extensive touring for Ænima in Pomona, California, where they debuted "Forty-Six & 2", "Hooker with a Penis", "Jimmy" and "Third Eye". This was also Chancellor's first show with the band. "Die Eier von Satan" was played once on December 19, 1996. They also played South Park's 'Spirit of Christmas' animated Christmas card during the show. During this year, Tool started extending "Prison Sex" by adding an extra verse—known by fans as "Prison Sex OTRM" ("on the road mix" or "over the rainbow mix")—and the intro to "Sober", which later appeared on Salival as the track "Merkaba". Tool's stage show grew with the addition of two giant projection screens. Keenan would paint himself blue and white for his performances, and Chancellor would also sometimes be painted with spots. Although the band was changing the set list up quite a bit at the beginning of the tour, they fell into a 'comfortable' set list during November which was played for the rest of the year with one or two wild card songs. A typical 1996 set list would look like this:

"Third Eye"
"Stinkfist"
"Forty-Six & 2"
"Cold & Ugly"
"Eulogy"
"Prison Sex"
"Pushit"
"Merkaba"
"Sober"
"Opiate"
"Ænema"

As an opening band

As the headlining band

Festivals

Guest musicians

These musicians have joined Tool on stage.

References

External links 
 Live Recording Database
 Fan maintained tour info
Tool Tour Dates
 Tool Concert Poster Archive

Lists of concert tours
Tool (band)